The First Congregational Church is an historic church in Stoneham, Massachusetts.  Built in 1840, it is a fine local example of Greek Revival architecture, and is a landmark in the town center.  It was listed on the National Register of Historic Places on April 13, 1984.  The church is affiliated with the United Church of Christ; the current pastor is the Rev. Ken McGarry.

Description and history
Stoneham's First Congregational Church is set on the east side of Main Street (Massachusetts Route 28), just north of the town common, which is across Church Street.  The main sanctuary is a rectangular wood-frame building, with a gable roof and a brick foundation.  The front facade, facing west, is flushboarded, while the remaining sides are clapboarded.  The main facade is divided into three bays by Doric pilasters, each bay having an entrance at the ground level with a window above.  The pilasters support an entablature that extends around the sides of the building, with a fully pedimented gable end above.  The pediment has a triangular window at its center.  The tower rises from the ridge line near the front, with a plain square stage rising to a louvered belfry stage and an octagonal spire.  Modern facilities are added to the rear of the building.

The congregation was organized in 1729; this, its third sanctuary, was built in 1840 after the second one burned.  It was listed on the National Register of Historic Places in 1984, and was included as part of the Central Square Historic District in 1990.  It is the meeting location of Boy Scout Troop 513 and the home of the First Church Stoneham Food Pantry and the Purpose School, a private pre-school that was formed in 1943.

See also
National Register of Historic Places listings in Stoneham, Massachusetts
National Register of Historic Places listings in Middlesex County, Massachusetts

References

External links
First Congregational Church of Stoneham

United Church of Christ churches in Massachusetts
Churches on the National Register of Historic Places in Massachusetts
Churches in Middlesex County, Massachusetts
Stoneham, Massachusetts
National Register of Historic Places in Stoneham, Massachusetts
Historic district contributing properties in Massachusetts